Sand Mountain may refer to:

Locations in the United States
 Sand Mountain (Alabama), a sandstone plateau in the Appalachian foothills of northeast Alabama (and, to a far lesser extent, extreme northwest Georgia)
 Sand Mountain (Florida), a hill in Florida
 Sand Mountain (Nevada), a singing sand dune in Nevada
 Sand Mountain Volcanic Field, a volcanic field in Oregon
 Sand Mountain (Chester County, Tennessee)

Fictional
 Sand Mountain, a ski resort in the fictional city of Bikini Bottom, in the TV series SpongeBob SquarePants